The 2018–19 Middle Tennessee Blue Raiders women's basketball team represented Middle Tennessee State University during the 2018–19 NCAA Division I women's basketball season. The Blue Raiders, led by fourteenth year head coach Rick Insell, played their home games at the Murphy Center and were fourth year members of Conference USA. They finished the season 23–11, 11–5 in C-USA play to finish in a tie for third place. They advanced to the championship game of the C-USA women's tournament where they lost to Rice. They received an at-large bid to the Women's National Invitation Tournament where they defeated IUPUI in the first round before losing to Ohio in the second round.

Roster

Schedule

|-
!colspan=9 style=| Exhibition

|-
!colspan=9 style=| Non-conference regular season

|-
!colspan=9 style=| Conference USA regular season

|-
!colspan=9 style=| Conference USA Women's Tournament

|-
!colspan=9 style=| WNIT

See also
2018–19 Middle Tennessee Blue Raiders men's basketball team

References

Middle Tennessee Blue Raiders women's basketball seasons
Middle Tennessee
Middle Tennessee Blue Raiders
Middle Tennessee Blue Raiders
Middle Tennessee